Service Crew could refer to: 

 Leeds United Service Crew
 Person providing service
 Car attendant